Hyderabad has a Muslim population of 30 %, and is home to iconic and historical mosques and dargahs. Many of these mosques were built during the reign of the Bahmani Sultans, Qutb Shahi dynasty and the Nizams of Hyderabad.

List

 Afzal Gunj Masjid
 Charminar
 Chowk Ke Masjid
 Hayat Bakshi Mosque
 Jama Masjid Golconda
 Jamia Masjid Al-Kauser
 Kulsum Begum Masjid
 Khairtabad Mosque 
 Koh-e-qaim
 Makkah Masjid
 Mian Mishk Masjid
 Masjid-e-Akhtarunnisa Begum
 Musheerabad Masjid
 Spanish Mosque
 Shahi Masjid
 Toli Masjid

Dargahs
 Dargah Yousufain
 Moula Ali Dargah
 Azakhane Zehra
 Paigah Tombs

References
 Qutb Shahi architecture, art, pride of Deccan

Hyderabad
 
Hyderabad, India-related lists
Hyderabad
Lists of buildings and structures in Telangana